Kawthar Abdelhamid Zaki (born 1940) is an Egyptian-American electrical engineer, known for her work in microwave engineering including the design of microwave waveguides, resonators, and filters. She is a professor emerita of electrical and computer engineering at the University of Maryland, College Park.

Education and career
Zaki is originally from Egypt, and is a 1962 graduate of Ain Shams University. She was the first woman to earn a doctorate in electrical engineering from the University of California, Berkeley, in 1969, and the first female engineering professor at the University of Maryland, beginning there in 1970.

Recognition
Zaki  was named a Fellow of the IEEE in 1991, "for contributions to the analysis of dielectric waveguides and resonators and their applications in microwave filters and oscillators design". She is also a Fellow of the Electromagnetics Academy.

References

1940 births
Living people
Egyptian electrical engineers
Egyptian women academics
American electrical engineers
American women engineers
Ain Shams University alumni
UC Berkeley College of Engineering alumni
University of Maryland, College Park faculty
Fellow Members of the IEEE
21st-century American women